Ekaterina Sokirianskaia (December 19, 1975) is a Russian human rights researcher, journalist, writer, professor of political science. Her researches dedicated mostly to the region of North Caucasus, where she worked at "Memorial", non-governmental  human rights center from 2003 to 2008 as researcher, and at the Grozny University, where she taught political science.

Biography

Birth place
Ekaterina Sokirianskaia was born in the City of Leningrad (present day, Saint Petersburg) on December 19, 1975.

Education
Studied in Foreign Languages Faculty at Herzen University, Philosophy and Political Science Faculty at the Saint Petersburg State University, had Russian degree of Candidate of Sciences for research "Methodology and techniques of negotiation in resolving ethnopolitical conflicts" (2002).  She has Doctor of Philosophy degree in political science from Central European University, Budapest.

Career 

Ekaterina Sokirianskaia lived 17 years in North Caucasus, researching political situation. From 2003 to 2008, Sokirianskaia was a team of the Memorial Center in Ingushetia and Chechnya, monitoring and researching human rights conditions and during war conflicts as well as Ossetian–Ingush Conflict, her projects were "Database of missing residents of the Chechen Republic" and "Countering falsification of criminal cases in the framework of counter-terrorism operations in the North Caucasus". From 2004 to 2006 she taught in the History Faculty of the Grozny State University. From 2008 to 2011, she was program curator at the Memorial Centers in Kabardino-Balkaria and Dagestan, researching situation with human rights violations, work at settlement of new offices of the Memorial in Nalchik and Makhachkala.

Ekaterina Sokirianskaia was a spokeswoman of International Crisis Group in Russia since November 2011.
She cooperated with the Expert Council under the Commissioner for Human Rights in the Russian Federation as an expert (about 2007).

Publications (selective, not complete list)

Sokirianskaia, E. 2005, Forced migration in the Northern Caucasus: involving local stakeholders in the process of returning Ingush IDPs (Policy Analyses) (p. 19). Budapest: Central european university, center for policy studies; Open society institute
Sokirianskaia, E. 2006, Modern nation-building in the northern caucasus : Ingushetia 1992-2004. In W. J. Burszta & T. Kamusella (Eds.), Nationalisms across the globe: an overview of nationalisms in state-endowed and stateless nations. The world. Vol. 2 (p. 469). Poznań: School of Humanities and Journalism.
Sokirianskaia, E., 2006, Getting Back Home? Towards Sustainable Return of Ingush Forced Migrants and Lasting Peace in Prigorodny District of North Ossetia (Policy Analyses) (p. 49). Budapest: Central european university, center for policy studies; Open society institute
Sokirianskaia, E. 2010, Governing Fragmented Societies: State-Building and Political Integration in Chechnya and Ingushetia (1991-2009). Central Europe University, Budapest
Sokirianskaia, E. 2010, Ideology and Conflict: Chechen Political Nationalism Prior to and During, Ten Years of War. In M. Gammer (Ed.), Ethno-nationalism, Islam and the state in the Caucasus : post-Soviet disorder (pp. 102–138). London: Routledge
Sokirianskaia, E. 2013, December 5, Winter Games, Caucasian Misery. New York Times
Sokirianskaia, E. 2013, December 7, A Chill Wind in the Caucasus. New York Times, p. A21
Sokirianskaia, E. 2014, State and Violence in Chechnya (1997–1999). In A. Regamey, E. Sieca-Kozlowski, & A. Le Huérou (Eds.), Chechnya at War and Beyond (pp. 93–117). New York: Routledge/Taylor & Francis
Sokirianskaia, E. 2015, To the Islamic State and Back. Crisis Group
Sokirianskaia, E. 2016, Russia’s North Caucasus Insurgency Widens as ISIS’ Foothold Grows. World Politics Review
Sokirianskaia, E. 2017, March 22, Vladimir Putin has one reliable set of allies: Russia’s iron ladies. Guardian
Sokirianskaia, E. 2017, May 3, Chechnya’s Anti-Gay Pogrom. New York Times
Sokirianskaia, E. 2017, August 1, Is Chechnya Taking Over Russia? International New York Times

References

External links
 Ekaterina Sokirianskaia, the International Crisis Group's North Caucasus expert, speaking about field research "The North Caucasus Insurgency and Syria: An Exported Jihad?", also participated in discussion, Sufian Zhemukhov, Senior Research Associate, George Washington University, moderated by Olga Oliker, Russia and Eurasia Program, Center for Strategic and International Studies (Center for Strategic & International Studies April 14, 2016, "The North Caucasus Insurgency and Syria", YouTube, accessed September 2, 2020 https://www.youtube.com/watch?v=YcmnA7lJ_i4&list=WL&index=115&t=0s)

Women human rights activists
Women in the Chechen wars
Russian human rights activists
Memorial (society)
1975 births
Living people